Epanastasis sophroniellus is a moth of the family Autostichidae. It is found on the Canary Islands.

The wingspan is about 12 mm. The ground colour of the forewings is yellowish brown. The hindwings are dark grey.

References

Moths described in 1895
Epanastasis